

Colors in alphabetical order N–Z 

|}

See also

Basic Color Terms: Their Universality and Evolution (book)
Color blindness
Colors of the rainbow
Eye color
Index of color-related articles
List of colors: A–F
List of colors: G–M
List of color palettes
List of colors (compact)
List of Crayola crayon colors
Pantone colors
Pigment
Primary color
Secondary color
Tertiary color
Tincture (heraldry)
Valspar
X11 color names

References

C03